Gary C. Suhadolnik is an American politician. He is a former Republican member of the Ohio Senate, representing the 24th District of the U.S. state of Ohio from 1981 to 1999.  He resigned in 1999 to take a position under Governor Bob Taft. From 2003 to 2008, he served as executive director of the Ohio Turnpike Commission. He now resides with his wife Nancy in Fort Myers, Florida and Cleveland, Ohio.

References 

Living people
Republican Party Ohio state senators
People from Strongsville, Ohio
Year of birth missing (living people)